Marie Josephine Hull (née Sherwood; January 3, 1877 – March 12, 1957) was an American stage and film actress who also was a director of plays. She had a successful 50-year career on stage while taking some of her better known roles to film. She won an Academy Award for Best Supporting Actress for the movie Harvey (1950), a role she originally played on the Broadway stage. She was sometimes credited as Josephine Sherwood.

Background
Hull was born January 3, 1877, in Newtonville, Massachusetts, one of four children born to William H. Sherwood and Mary Elizabeth "Minnie" Tewkesbury, but would later shave years off her age. She attended the New England Conservatory of Music and Radcliffe College, both in the Boston area.

Career

Stage
Hull made her stage debut in 1905, and after some years as a chorus girl and touring stock player, she married actor Shelley Hull (the elder brother of actor Henry Hull) in 1910. After her husband's death as a young man, the actress retired until 1923, when she returned to acting using her married name, Josephine Hull. The couple had no children.

She had her first major stage success in George Kelly's Pulitzer-winning Craig's Wife in 1926. Kelly wrote a role especially for her in his next play, Daisy Mayme, which also was staged in 1926. She continued working in New York theater throughout the 1920s. In the 1930s and 1940s, Hull appeared in three Broadway hits, as a batty matriarch in You Can't Take It with You (1936), as a homicidal old lady in Arsenic and Old Lace (1941), and in Harvey (1944). The plays all had long runs, and took up ten years of Hull's career. Her last Broadway play, The Solid Gold Cadillac (1954–55), was later made into a film version with the much younger Judy Holliday in the role.

Film
Hull made only seven films, beginning in 1927 with a small part in the Clara Bow feature Get Your Man, followed by The Bishop's Candlesticks in 1929. That was followed by two 1932 Fox features, After Tomorrow (recreating her stage role) and Careless Lady. 

She missed out on recreating her You Can't Take It With You role in 1938, as she was still onstage with the show. Instead, Spring Byington appeared in the film version.

Hull played Aunt Abby who, along with Jean Adair as Aunt Martha, was one of the two Brewster sisters in the film version of Arsenic and Old Lace (1944) starring Cary Grant and Priscilla Lane.

Hull then appeared in the screen version of Harvey (1950), for which she won the Academy Award for Best Supporting Actress. Variety credited Hull's performance: "the slightly balmy aunt (actually playing “Elwood's” sister, “Veta”)  who wants to have Elwood committed, is immense, socking the comedy for every bit of its worth".

After Harvey, Hull made only one more film, The Lady from Texas (1951); she had also appeared in the CBS-TV version of Arsenic and Old Lace in 1949, with Ruth McDevitt, an actress who often succeeded Hull in her Broadway roles, as her sister.

Death
Hull died on March 12, 1957, aged 80, from a cerebral hemorrhage.

Broadway performances

 The Law and the Man (Dec 20, 1906 – Feb 1907, billed as Josephine Sherwood) Role: Cosette (Replacement)
 The Bridge (Sep 4, 1909 – Oct 1909, billed as Josephine Sherwood)
 Neighbors  (Dec 26, 1923 – Jan 1924, billed as Josephine Hull) Role: Mrs. Hicks
 Fata Morgana (Mar 3, 1924 – Sep 1924) Role: George's Mother
 Rosmersholm (May 5, 1925 – May 1925) Role: Madame Helseth
 Craig's Wife (Oct 12, 1925 – Aug 1926) Role: Mrs. Frazier
 Daisy Mayme  (Oct 25, 1926 – Jan 1927) Role: Mrs. Olly Kipax
 The Wild Man of Borneo (Sep 13, 1927 – Sep 1927) Role: Mrs. Marshall
 March Hares  (Apr 2, 1928 – Apr 1928) Role: Mrs. Janet Rodney
 The Beaux Stratagem (Jun 4, 1928 – Jun 1928) Role: Servant in the Inn
 Hotbed (Nov 8, 1928 – Nov 1928) Role: Hattie
 Before You're 25 (Apr 16, 1929 – May 1929) Role: Cornelia Corbin
 Those We Love (Feb 19, 1930 – Apr 1930) Role: Evelyn
 Midnight (Dec 29, 1930 – Feb 1931) Role: Mrs. Weldon
 Unexpected Husband (Jun 2, 1931 – Sep 1931) Role: Mrs. Egbert Busty
 After Tomorrow (Aug 26, 1931 – Nov 1931) Role: Mrs. Piper
 A Thousand Summers (May 24, 1932 – Jul 1932) Role: Mrs. Thompson
 American Dream (Feb 21, 1933 – Mar 1933) Role: Martha, Mrs. Schuyler Hamilton
 A Divine Drudge (Oct 26, 1933 – Nov 1933) Role: Frau Klapstuhl
 By Your Leave (Jan 24, 1934 – Feb 1934) Role: Mrs. Gretchell
 On to Fortune (Feb 4, 1935 – Feb 1935) Role: Miss Hedda Sloan
 Seven Keys to Baldpate (May 27, 1935 – Jun 1935) Role: Mrs. Quinby
 Night In the House (Nov 7, 1935 – Nov 1935) Role: Lucy Amorest
 You Can't Take It with You (Dec 14, 1936 – Dec 3, 1938) Role: Penelope Sycamore
 An International Incident (Apr 2, 1940 – Apr 13, 1940) Role: Mrs. John Wurthering Blackett
 Arsenic and Old Lace (Jan 10, 1941 – Jun 17, 1944) Role: Abby Brewster
 Harvey (Nov 1, 1944 – Jan 15, 1949) Role: Veta Louise Simmons
 Minnie and Mr. Williams (Oct 27, 1948 – Oct 30, 1948) Role: Minnie
 The Golden State (Nov 25, 1950 – Dec 16, 1950) Role: Mrs. Morenas
 Whistler's Grandmother (Dec 11, 1952 – Jan 3, 1953) Role: Kate
 The Solid Gold Cadillac  (Nov 5, 1953 – Feb 12, 1955) Role: Mrs. Laura Partridge

Broadway director credits

 Why Not? (Dec 25, 1922 – Apr 1923, billed as Mrs. Shelley Hull)
 The Rivals (May 7, 1923 – May 1923, billed as Mrs. Shelley Hull)
 The Habitual Husband (Dec 24, 1924 – Jan 1925)

Filmography

Radio appearances

See also

List of actors with Academy Award nominations

References

Further reading
 Carson, William Glasgow Bruce, Dear Josephine, the Theatrical Career of Josephine Hull, Norman: University of Oklahoma Press, 1963

External links

 
 
 
 
 Papers, 1871–1957. Schlesinger Library, Radcliffe Institute, Harvard University.

1877 births
1957 deaths
20th-century American actresses
Actresses from Boston
American film actresses
American stage actresses
American theatre directors
Women theatre directors
American television actresses
Best Supporting Actress Academy Award winners
Best Supporting Actress Golden Globe (film) winners
Donaldson Award winners
New England Conservatory alumni
Radcliffe College alumni
Actors from Newton, Massachusetts
Age controversies